Giovanni Battista Lercari (Genoa, 1507Genoa, 1592) was the 64th Doge of the Republic of Genoa.

Biography 
Giovanni Battista Lercari was elected on 7 October 1563 the new doge of the Republic of Genoa, the nineteenth since the biennial reform and the sixty-fourth in republican history.  His Dogate was dominated by a new internal contrast between the "old" and "new" nobility that fractured after the clashes that took place in Corsica, after the death of the admiral Andrea Doria and above all from the new international scenarios. Giovanni Battista Lercari died in 1592 in the Genoese capital leaving as his only heir his daughter Pellina.

See also 
 Republic of Genoa
 Doge of Genoa

References 

16th-century Doges of Genoa
1507 births
1592 deaths